The Serbian Hockey League 1992-1993 season was the second season of the league. Four teams participated. KHK Crvena Zvezda won their second consecutive title.

Teams
HK Partizan
KHK Crvena Zvezda
HK Spartak Subotica
HK Vojvodina

Final standings

Vojvodina and Partizan played three games fewer than Crvena Zvezda and Spartak

Playoffs
In the finals KHK Crvena Zvezda beat HK Spartak Subotica.

Serbian Hockey League
Serbian Hockey League seasons
Serb